Carewe is a surname. Notable people with this surname include: 
Arthur Edmund Carewe (1884–1937), Armenian-American actor
Edwin Carewe (1883–1940), American film director
John Carewe (born 1933), British music conductor
Mary Carewe, British singer
Rita Carewe (1909–1955), American actress

See also
Carew